Dawn at the Alamo is a 1905 painting by Henry Arthur McArdle, displayed in the Texas State Capitol's Senate Chamber, in Austin, Texas, United States. The artwork has received some negative criticism by scholars for depicting David Crockett and William B. Travis with "an angelic glow amid dark imagery".

See also

 1905 in art

References

1905 paintings
History paintings
Paintings in Austin, Texas